F6 disk is a colloquial name for a floppy disk containing a device driver that enables Windows Setup to install Microsoft Windows on storage devices based on SCSI, SATA, or RAID technologies. All versions of the Windows NT family prior to Windows Vista required F6 disks. Starting with Windows Vista, Windows Setup supports loading third-party drivers from USB drives and CD-ROMs.

Usage 
An F6 disk is named after the manner in which it is used. During the installation process, Windows Setup must load device drivers for the storage system on which Windows will be installed. Microsoft ships Windows with device drivers that support popular storage hardware. However, newer storage technologies will inevitably appear after the release of each version of Windows, needing newer drivers. To use these drivers, Windows Setup prompts its user to press the F6 key shortly after the setup process starts.

Hardware manufacturers often provided their device drivers on CD-ROMs. Prior to Windows Vista, however, Windows Setup only supported reading storage drivers from the root directory of a floppy disk. Thus, users must have copied said drivers from their CD-ROMs an F6 disk. Starting with Windows Vista, Windows Setup runs on a copy of Windows Preinstallation Environment. Thus, it can read device drivers from CD-ROMs and USB flash drives.

Alternative 
An alternative approach is to slipstream the required drivers into the Windows installation source. Prior to Windows Vista, doing so required third-party software such as nLite. After Windows Vista, Microsoft's DISM utility supports customizing a Windows installation source.

References 

RAID
Device drivers
Windows components
Patch utilities